Beenish Chohan is a Pakistani actress and model. She is known for her roles in dramas Aik Aur Sitam Hai, Mera Saaein, Yeh Zindagi Hai, Tarap and Chaudhry and Sons.

Early life
Beenish was born on February 7 in Lahore, Pakistan. She completed her studies from University of Lahore.

Career
She made her debut as an actress in 2000 on PTV. She is known for her roles in PTV dramas Malangi, Pheli Boond, Ghat Ki Khatir, Chalo Phir Se Jee Kar Dekhain and Mera Saaein on ARY Digital. She also starred as Nargis in the television series Yeh Zindagi Hai, which ran for six long years. Then she appeared in dramas Shakoor Saab, Bin Tere, Amma Aur Gulnaz, Matam and Chalo Phir Se Jee Kar Dekhain. Since then she appeared in dramas Meri Behan Meri Dewrani, Badbakht, Aik Aur Sitam Hai, Tarap and Chaudhry and Sons. She also appeared in telefilms Sudha Ki Kalha, Beqarar and Unchi Gehrai.

Personal life
Beenish is married and has a son.

Filmography

Television

Telefilm

Film

Awards and nominations

References

External links
 
 
 

1986 births
21st-century Pakistani actresses
Living people
Pakistani television actresses
Lux Style Award winners
Punjabi people
Pakistani film actresses